Randolph Lycett and Max Woosnam were the defending champions, but Woosnam did not participate. Lycett partnered with James Anderson and  defeated Pat O'Hara Wood and Gerald Patterson in the final, 3–6, 7–9, 6–4, 6–3, 11–9 to win the gentlemen's doubles tennis title at the 1922 Wimbledon Championships.

Draw

Finals

Top half

Section 1

Section 2

Bottom half

Section 3

Section 4

References

External links

 

Men's Doubles
Wimbledon Championship by year – Men's doubles